Henrykowo  is a settlement in the administrative district of Gmina Kętrzyn, within Kętrzyn County, Warmian-Masurian Voivodeship, in northern Poland.

The settlement has an approximate population of 16.

References

Villages in Kętrzyn County